Stephen William "Steve" Davies (born 26 October 1965) is an Australian Liberal National politician who was the member of the Legislative Assembly of Queensland for Capalaba from 2012 to 2015.

References

1965 births
Living people
Liberal National Party of Queensland politicians
Members of the Queensland Legislative Assembly
21st-century Australian politicians